Lajos Somló (19 August 1912 – 4 August 1990) was a Hungarian athlete. He competed in the men's triple jump at the 1936 Summer Olympics.

References

External links

1912 births
1990 deaths
Athletes (track and field) at the 1936 Summer Olympics
Hungarian male triple jumpers
Olympic athletes of Hungary